Oxytelus lividus is a species of rove beetle widely spread in Asia. It is found in China, Sri Lanka, India, Myanmar, Malaysia, Thailand, Vietnam, Indonesia, and Laos.

Description
Male is about 6.1 mm and female is 5.5 mm in length. Body is khaki to dark ocher. Lateral parts of pronotum, lateral and posterior margins of elytra are  yellow. Elytral bases are black in color. Mandibles are testaceous or lateritious with black margins. In Antennae, there are 1 to 3 antennomeres. Maxillary palpi, and legs are also testaceous.

In male, head is sub-trapezoidal and roughly coriaceous. Clypeus reversed trapezoidal. Epistomal suture with lateral portions straight but lightly incurved at posterior end. Eyes with coarse facets. Mandible is stout, falciform, and strongly incurved. Pronotum transverse. Elytra rough and rugose. Abdomen coriaceous and pubescent. Sternite VIII is strongly sclerotized. In female, head is sub-triangular. Clypeus sub-quadrate. Epistomal suture with lateral portions incurved. Abdominal sternite VII with posterior margin is straight. Spermatheca is comma-shaped.

References 

Staphylinidae
Insects of Sri Lanka
Insects of India
Beetles described in 1857